Highlands is a residential neighbourhood in north east Edmonton, Alberta, Canada overlooking the North Saskatchewan River valley.  The area was annexed by Edmonton in 1912, and "was named in a contest offering a 50-dollar prize."  In 2012, Highlands was ranked one of Canada's top ten neighbourhoods of old homes by the magazine This Old House.

The neighbourhood is bounded on the north by 118 (Alberta) Avenue, on the east by 50 Street, on the west by 67 Street, and on the south by the North Saskatchewan River valley.  Interchanges between Wayne Gretzky Drive and both 118 Avenue and 112 Avenue give residents access to destinations south of the river including Whyte Avenue and the University of Alberta.

Residents also have access to Northlands, the (former) Coliseum, Commonwealth Stadium and Concordia University of Edmonton.  All four facilities are located a short distance west of the neighbourhood.

The community is represented by the Highlands Community League, established in 1921, which maintains a community hall, outdoor rink, and a lawn bowling club located at 61 Street and 113 Avenue.

Demographics 

Residential development 
Highlands is an older Edmonton neighbourhood.  According to the 2001 federal census, approximately one residence in three (31.3%) were built by the end of World War II in 1945.  Half the residences (47.2%) were built between 1946 and 1960.  Another one in eight residences were built between 1961 and 1980.  By 1990, residential development was substantially complete.

The most common type of residence in the neighbourhood, according to the 2012 municipal census, is the single-family dwelling. Single family dwellings account for nine out of every ten (90%) of all the residences in the neighbourhood.  One out of every fourteen residences is a rented apartment in a low-rise building with fewer than five stories.  Rounding out the residences are a small number (2%) of duplexes.  Four out of every five residences (81%) are owner-occupied with only one residence in five (19%) being rented.

Schools 

There are two schools in the neighbourhood, Highlands School (K to 9) which is operated by the Edmonton Public School System. Mount Royal School is permanently closed.

Notable residents 
Marshall McLuhan, recipient of numerous awards and appointments and a pioneer of media theory was born in Edmonton and spent his formative years living with his family in the Highlands neighbourhood. He would recall memories of the first home in which he lived and the expanse of the adjacent river valley, and his early explorations of visual perspective as a fundamental artistic and communicational principle. Computer scientist (and early Google investor) David Cheriton grew up in the area and attended public schools.
There is a children's garden and memorial stone, dedicated to Trooper Michael Yuki Hayakaza, a Highlands community member who was killed during a military tour of duty in Afghanistan.  The memorial stone is located at the foot of the children's play park.

Surrounding neighbourhoods

See also 
 Edmonton Federation of Community Leagues

References

External links 
 Highlands Community League
 Highlabds Lawn Bowling Club
 Highlands Historical Society
 Mount Royal Elementary School and memories of Highlands
 Highlands School
 Highlands Junior High School Flickr

Neighbourhoods in Edmonton